Sami, also Samy or Sammy, is a given name and surname of different origins and meanings, most prevalent in the Arab world and Scandinavia.

Arabic 
Sami, Samy, Samee (Arabic: سامي samī) , is an Arabic male given name meaning "elevated (رَفْعَة raf‘ah)" or "sublime (سُمُوّ sumū/ sumuw)", in fact stemmed from the verb samā (سما) which means "to transcend", where the verb forms the adjective Sami which means "to be high, elevated, eminent, prominent".  

The female given name, Samiya or Samia (سامِيَة), is formed and stemmed from this name.

The name Sami is often confused with other Arabic male given names, Samee (Arabic for 'one who hears') or Samir, specifically amongst non-native Arabic speakers when used outside of English-speaking countries.

Others 
Sami as a Turkish and Finnish male name derived from the name Samuel, or an American name abbreviated from Samantha or Samuel.

Given name
Sami (poet) (1743-1850), Sindhi poet who wrote Shlokas in Beit form 
Sami Aslam (born 1995), Pakistani cricketer
Sami al-Hinnawi (1898–1950), Syrian politician and military officer
Sami Al-Jaber (born 1972), Saudi Arabian retired footballer
Sami Allagui (born 1986), German-born Tunisian footballer
Sami as-Solh (1887–1968), five-time prime minister of Lebanon
Sami Bayraktar (born 1978), Turkish-Belgian futsal player
Sami Bouajila (born 1966), French actor
Sami Callihan (born 1987), American professional wrestler
Sami Chohfi (born 1982), American singer/songwriter
Sami Güçlü (born 1950), Turkish politician
Sami Ibrahim Haddad (1890–1957), Palestinian-Lebanese physician and writer
Sami Hyypiä (born 1973), Finnish footballer
Sami Jauhojärvi (born 1981), Finnish cross-country skier
Samy Kamkar, American security researcher
Sami Kapanen (born 1973), Finnish ice hockey player
Sami Khedira (born 1987), German footballer
Sami Kehela (born 1934), Canadian contract bridge player
Sam Lake (real name Sami Järvi, born 1970), Finnish writer
Sami Mahlio (born 1972), Finnish footballer
Sami Mansei (fl. 720), Japanese Buddhist priest and poet
Sami Michael (born 1926), Israeli author and president of The Association for Civil Rights in Israel
Sami Moubayed (born 1978), Syrian historian
Sami Levi (born 1981), Turkish singer
Sami Osmakac, convicted Kosovar-American terrorist
Sami Rähmönen (born 1987), Finnish footballer
Sami Ristilä (born 1974), Finnish footballer
Samantha "Sami" Shapiro (born 1993), American gymnast
Sami Sharaf (1929–2023), Egyptian military officer and politician
Sami Sirviö (born 1970), Swedish musician and lead guitarist of the rock band Kent
Sami Uotila (disambiguation), various Finnish people
Sami Yli-Sirniö (born 1972), Finnish guitarist for the thrash metal band Kreator
Sami Yusuf (born 1980), British musician
Sami Zayn (born 1984), ring name of Rami Sebei, Canadian professional wrestler of Syrian descent
Bekir Sami Kunduh (1867–1933), the first Minister of Foreign Affairs of Turkey

Surname
Adnan Sami (born 1973), Indian musician and actor
C. M. Shafi Sami, Bangladeshi politician
Jagannath Sami, Fijian labor-leader, politician, and soccer player
Joël Sami (born 1984), French footballer
Leocísio Sami (born 1988), Bissau-Guinean footballer
Madeleine Sami (born 1980), New Zealand actress
Mohammad Sami (born 1981), Pakistani cricketer

See also
Sami (disambiguation)
Sammie (name)
Samee, male name
Samuel (name)
Samir (name)
Samira (disambiguation)
Samantha

References

Arabic masculine given names
Bosniak masculine given names
Finnish masculine given names
Pakistani masculine given names
Surnames from given names